Chlortalidone, also known as chlorthalidone, is a thiazide-like diuretic drug used to treat high blood pressure, swelling including that due to heart failure, liver failure, and nephrotic syndrome, diabetes insipidus, and renal tubular acidosis. Because chlortalidone is reliably effective in most patients with high blood pressure, it is considered a preferred initial treatment. It is also used to prevent calcium-based kidney stones. It is taken by mouth. Effects generally begin within three hours and last for up to three days. Strong evidence suggests chlortalidone is more effective than hydrochlorothiazide for prevention of heart attack or stroke.

Common adverse effects include low blood potassium, low blood sodium, high blood sugar, dizziness, and erectile dysfunction. Other adverse effects may include gout, low blood magnesium, high blood calcium, allergic reactions, and low blood pressure. Some reviews have found chlortalidone and hydrochlorothiazide to have a similar risk of adverse effects, while other reviews have found chlortalidone to have a higher risk. While it may be used in pregnancy it is a less preferred option. How it works is not completely clear but is believed to involve increasing the amount of sodium and water lost by the kidneys.

Chlortalidone was patented in 1957 and came into medical use in 1960. It is on the World Health Organization's List of Essential Medicines. It is available as a generic medication. In 2020, it was the 133rd most commonly prescribed medication in the United States, with more than 4million prescriptions.

Medical use

High blood pressure
Chlortalidone is considered a first-line medication for treatment high blood pressure. Some recommend chlortalidone over hydrochlorothiazide. A meta-analysis of randomized controlled trials found that chlortalidone is more effective than hydrochlorothiazide for lowering blood pressure, while the two drugs have similar toxicity.

Trials of chlortalidone for high blood pressure found that lower doses of chlortalidone (e.g., 12.5 mg daily in ALLHAT study) had maximal blood pressure lowering effect and that higher doses did not lower it more. Chlortalidone and other thiazide diuretics are effective for lowering high blood pressure in persons with chronic kidney disease, although the risk of adverse effects is higher in these persons.

Left ventricular hypertrophy
Chlortalidone is used to treat left ventricular hypertrophy in the heart; it works chiefly by lowering blood pressure, and thereby reducing systemic vascular resistance. There is evidence that chlortalidone is superior to hydrochlorothiazide for reducing the mass of the left ventricle of the heart in persons with enlargement of the left ventricle of the heart. Chlortalidone is superior to angiotensin converting enzyme Inhibitors or angiotensin II receptor blockers for inducing regression of enlargement of the left ventricle, which is the main pumping chamber of the heart.

Swelling
Chlortalidone reduces edema (swelling) by increasing urinary salt and water excretion, lowering intravascular hydrostatic pressure and thereby lowering transcapillary pressure (see Starling Equation). Edema may be caused by either increased hydrostatic pressure or reduced oncotic pressure in the blood vessels. Edema due to increased hydrostatic pressure may be a result of serious cardiopulmonary disease (which reduces glomerular perfusion in the kidney) or to kidney injury or disease (which may reduce glomerular excretion of salt and water by the kidney) or due to relatively benign conditions such as menstrual-related fluid retention, or as an adverse effect of dihydropyridine calcium channel blockers, which commonly cause swelling of the feet and lower legs. Edema due to decreased oncotic pressure may be a result of leaking of blood proteins through the glomeruli of an injured kidney or a result of diminished synthesis of blood proteins by a damaged liver. Regardless of cause, chlortalidone may reduce the severity of edema by reducing intravascular volume and thereby reducing intravascular hydrostatic pressure.

Bone fracture prevention
Chlortalidone decreases mineral bone loss by promoting calcium retention by the kidney, and by directly stimulating osteoblast differentiation and bone mineral formation. A Cochrane review found tentative evidence that thiazide exposure was associated with a reduced risk of hip fracture. A secondary analysis of data from the ALLHAT study found that chlortalidone reduced risk of hip and pelvis fracture.

Kidney stone prevention
Chlortalidone reduces the amount of calcium excreted in urine, reducing the risk of calcium oxalate kidney stones. In people who have had multiple episodes of calcium oxalate kidney stones, chlortalidone lowers the risk of having another episode of kidney stones. Chlortalidone is more effective than hydrochlorothiazide for lowering urine calcium levels and is therefore probably more effective.

Ménière's disease
Chlortalidone reduces the volume and thereby reduces the pressure in the inner ear chambers; elevated endolymph pressure in the inner ear is thought to be the cause of Ménière's disease or ’Endolymphatic hydrops.’ Synthesis of evidence from multiple small, low-quality studies indicates that chlortalidone or other thiazide diuretics are effective for Ménière's Disease.

Diabetes insipidus
Chlortalidone (or other thiazide medication) is a key component of treatment of nephrogenic diabetes insipidus. Nephrogenic diabetes insipidus occurs when the kidney is unable to produce concentrated urine because it has an inadequate response to vasopressin-dependent removal of free water from the renal tubular filtrate. By blocking sodium ion resorption in the distal convoluted tubule, chlortalidone induces an increase in excretion of sodium ion in urine (natriuresis). Giving chlortalidone while simultaneously restricting dietary sodium intake causes mild hypovolemia (low intravascular volume), which induces isotonic reabsorption of solute from the proximal renal tubule, reducing solute delivery in the renal collecting tubule and renal medullary collecting duct. This reduced delivery of solute to the collecting tubule and medullary collecting duct allows increased water resorption and higher concentration of urine, which leads to reversal of nephrogenic diabetes insipidus by a means that is independent of vasopressin.

Adverse effects
Some reviews have found a similar risk as hydrochlorothiazide, while other reviews found a higher risk of side effects.

 Hypokalemia (low blood potassium) occurs occasionally; the risk of hypokalemia is higher in persons who are magnesium deficient
 Hypomagnesemia (low blood magnesium) a review of four clinical trials found that low blood magnesium occurred in 20% of persons within a few weeks of beginning treatment with 50 mg of chlortalidone daily. The risk of chlortalidone-associated hypomagnesemia is higher in persons with diabetes mellitus who have low dietary magnesium intake.
 Hyponatremia (low blood sodium) occurred in 4.1% of subjects randomized to chlortalidone in the Systolic Hypertension in the Elderly Trial, compared to 1.3% of control subjects. The risk of hyponatremia varies from 5 per 100,000 person-years for those younger than 40 years of age to 730 per 100,000 person-years in those older than 80 years of age. Hyponatremia is more likely in persons with certain genetic variants of the prostaglandin transporter SLCO2A1 associated with elevated urinary PGE2 and inappropriately low plasma ADH levels in the setting of low plasma osmolality. Thiazide-associated hyponatremia is often more severe than loop diuretic-associated hyponatremia because the predominant action of thiazides occurs late in the tubular flow, reducing opportunity to apply additional corrective action further along the tubule.
 Hypercalcemia (high blood calcium level) can occur in normal persons exposed to chlortalidone but is more likely to occur when persons with sub-clinical hyperparathyroidism are exposed to chlortalidone.
 Hyperuricemia, high levels of uric acid in the blood
 Hyperglycemia, high blood sugar is more common in persons who are magnesium deficient
 Hyperlipidemia, high cholesterol and triglycerides
 Headache
 Nausea/vomiting
 Photosensitivity increased susceptibility to sunburn of skin with sun exposure
 Photoonycholysis detachment of nails from nailbed with sun exposure
 Weight gain
 Gout; approximately doubles the risk
 Pancreatitis

The frequency and severity of these adverse effects is much reduced when chlortalidone is used at lower doses (e.g., 12.5 mg per day).

Mechanism of action
Chlortalidone reduces reabsorption of sodium and chloride primarily through inhibition of the Na+/Cl− symporter in the apical membrane of distal convoluted tubule cells in the kidney. Although chlortalidone is often referred to as a "thiazide-like" diuretic, it is unlike thiazide diuretics in that, in addition to its inhibition of the  Na+/Cl− symporter, it also strongly inhibits multiple isoforms of carbonic anhydrase. Some of chlortalidone's diuretic effect is also due to this inhibition of carbonic anhydrase in the proximal tubule. Chronic exposure to chlortalidone decreases the glomerular filtration rate. Chlortalidone's diuretic effect is diminished in persons with kidney impairment. By increasing the delivery of sodium to the distal renal tubule, chlortalidone indirectly increases potassium excretion via the sodium-potassium exchange mechanism (i.e. apical ROMK/Na channels coupled with basolateral Na+/K ATPases). This can result in a low blood concentration of potassium and chloride as well as a mild metabolic alkalosis; however, the diuretic effect of chlortalidone is not affected by the acid-base balance of the person being treated.

There is uncertainty about the mechanism of the blood pressure-lowering effect that occurs during chronic exposure to chlortalidone. Initially, diuretics lower blood pressure by decreasing cardiac output and reducing plasma and extracellular fluid volume. Eventually, cardiac output returns to normal, and plasma and extracellular fluid volume return to slightly less than normal, but a reduction in peripheral vascular resistance is maintained, thus resulting in an overall lower blood pressure. The reduction in intravascular volume induces an elevation in plasma renin activity and aldosterone secretion, further contributing to the potassium loss associated with thiazide diuretic therapy.

Pharmacokinetics
Chlortalidone is slowly absorbed from the gastrointestinal tract after oral ingestion. It has a long half-life and therefore a prolonged diuretic action, which results in continued diuretic effects despite a skipped dose. This prolonged action of chlortalidone despite missing doses may account for the higher efficacy of chlortalidone compared to the shorter half-life medication, hydrochlorothiazide. Chlortalidone is eliminated from the body mostly by the kidney, as unchanged drug. Thus, in persons with diminished kidney function, the clearance of chlortalidone is reduced and the elimination half-life is increased.

As with other thiazide diuretics, chlortalidone crosses the placenta and is excreted in breast milk. Chlortalidone may suppress lactation, and has been used for this indication. Due to its long half-life, chlortalidone may accumulate in newborns via breast milk, despite receiving only about 6% of the maternal weight-adjusted dose.

Chemistry
Chlortalidone is in the sulfamoylbenzamide class. As it lacks the benzothiadiazine structure of the thiazide-type diuretics, it is called a thiazide-like diuretic. Chlortalidone is freely soluble in dimethylacetamide (DMA), dimethylformamide (DMF), dimethylsulfoxide (DMSO), and methanol; it is also soluble in warm ethanol.

Chlortalidone is the official name of the medication according to the (INN/BAN), which is the medication naming system coordinated by the World Health Organization. Chlorthalidone is the official name of the medication according to the (USAN), which is the medication naming system coordinated by the USAN Council, which is co-sponsored by the American Medical Association (AMA), the United States Pharmacopeial Convention (USP), and the American Pharmacists Association (APhA).

Society and culture
Chlortalidone is banned for some sports (including cricket) because it is a diuretic, and can be used to reduce body weight or to mask the concomitant use of performance-enhancing drugs. Sports such as wrestling or boxing categorize athletes according to body weight; taking a diuretic such as chlortalidone may lower body weight, and thereby permit an athlete to compete in a lighter weight class, which would provide an advantage. Diuretics such as chlortalidone also reduce the urine concentration of concomitantly-taken performance-enhancing drugs or of their metabolites, thus making it more difficult to detect these drugs using urine testing.

References

External links
 

Wikipedia medicine articles ready to translate
Diuretics
Sulfonamides
Isoindolines
Novartis brands
Chloroarenes
Lactams
Carbonic anhydrase inhibitors
World Anti-Doping Agency prohibited substances